Baw Baw is a locality in the Goulburn Mulwaree Council, New South Wales, Australia. It lies about 7 km north of Goulburn and 95 km northeast of Canberra.

Baw Baw had a state public school from November 1879 to May 1941, except in 1937. This was described as a "public school" until October 1929, when it became a "half-time school".

References

Localities in New South Wales
Southern Tablelands
Goulburn Mulwaree Council